Wang Yuwei (born 16 July 1991) is a Chinese rower. She competed in the women's quadruple sculls event at the 2016 Summer Olympics.

References

External links
 

1991 births
Living people
Chinese female rowers
Olympic rowers of China
Rowers at the 2016 Summer Olympics
Asian Games medalists in rowing
Rowers at the 2014 Asian Games
Asian Games gold medalists for China
Medalists at the 2014 Asian Games
Rowers at the 2020 Summer Olympics
Medalists at the 2020 Summer Olympics
Olympic medalists in rowing
Olympic bronze medalists for China
21st-century Chinese women